Volume 2: Release is Afro Celt Sound System's second album, released on 25 January 1999 by Real World Records.

Release
A shorter edit of the title song "Release" was released in 1999 on the soundtrack for the American horror film Stigmata.
In 2000, Real World issued a single of the title track containing a remix of Rollo Armstrong and two remixes of Masters at Work.

Critical reception

The album was nominated for Best Global Music Album at the 42nd Annual Grammy Awards in 2000.

Track listing

Personnel

Afro Celt Sound System
 Simon Emmerson – guitar, programming, keyboard, production
 James McNally – keyboard, whistle, low whistle, bodhran, accordion, additional production
 Iarla Ó Lionáird – vocals, Irish lyrics and translations
 Martin Russell – keyboard, programming, engineering, production, recording, mix engineering (2, 4, 5, 8, 9)
 N'Faly Kouyate – vocals, kora, balafon, French and African lyrics
 Myrdhin – celtic harp
 Moussa Sissokho – talking drum, djembe

Additional musicians
 Ron Aslan – programming beats, additional production (2, 6)
 Ronan Browne – uilleann pipes (2, 3, 4, 9)
 Michael McGoldrick – uilleann pipes (1, 2, 5, 10, 11), flute (5)
 Sinéad O'Connor – vocals (1)
 Ashley Maher – vocals (8)
 Johnny Kalsi – dhol drums, tablas
 Nigel Eaton – hurdy gurdy (1, 11)
 Youth – bass (8)

Technical personnel
 Tristan Manco – graphic design
 Jamie Reid – paintings
 Ted Emmerson – video grab photos
 Joe Dobson – video grab photos
 David Bottrill – mix engineering (1, 3, 5–8, 10, 11)
 Marco Migliari – assistant engineering
 Claire Lewis – assistant engineering
 Ian Cooper – mastering

Chart positions

Album

Single

Sales figures
According to Nielsen SoundScan Volume 2: Release has sold 105,000 units in the United States.

References

1999 albums
Afro Celt Sound System albums
Real World Records albums
Sequel albums